Maya Barqui (or Berqui, ; born 22 September 1985) is an Israeli football defender. Barqui had played in the Israeli First League for Maccabi Haifa, Maccabi Holon and Maccabi Kishronot Hadera and played in the Champions League with both Maccabi Haifa and Maccabi Holon. and is a member of the Israeli national team, since making her debut in the 2003 World Cup qualifying against Wales. Barqui played so far 45 matches for the national team, the most capped player.

Honours
Championships (5):
 2001–02 (with Maccabi Haifa), 2004–05, 2005–06, 2006–07, 2007–08 (with Maccabi Holon).
Cup (9):
 2001–02 (with Maccabi Haifa), 2003–04, 2003–04, 2004–05, 2005–06, 2006–07, 2007–08, 2012–13 (with Maccabi Holon), 2014–15 (with Maccabi Kishronot Hadera).

References

External links
 
 
 

1985 births
Living people
Israeli women's footballers
Israel women's international footballers
Maccabi Haifa F.C. (women) players
Maccabi Holon F.C. (women) players
Maccabi Kishronot Hadera F.C. players
Women's association football defenders
Jewish sportspeople
Israeli Jews